Hoved Island is part of the Qikiqtaaluk Region of the Canadian territory of Nunavut. The island is located between the Svendsen and Bjorne peninsulas, and within the Baumann Fiord of Ellesmere Island, considered part of the Queen Elizabeth Islands, in the Arctic Archipelago.

Hoved Island was first charted and named (hoved, Norwegian for "main") by the second Norwegian expedition of the Fram (1898—1902) under Capt. Otto Sverdrup.

References

External links
 Hoved Island in the Atlas of Canada - Toporama; Natural Resources Canada

Islands of the Queen Elizabeth Islands
Islands of Baffin Bay
Uninhabited islands of Qikiqtaaluk Region